Scoparia pascoella is a species of moth in the family Crambidae. It is endemic to New Zealand.

Taxonomy
This species was described by Alfred Philpott in 1920. However the placement of this species within the genus Scoparia is in doubt. As a result, this species has also been referred to as Scoparia (s.l.) pascoella.

Etymology
The species is named in honour of Merlin Owen Pasco, a New Zealand entomologist who died in France during the First World War.

Description
The wingspan is 15–18 mm. The forewings are ferruginous-brown mingled with some fuscous and much suffused with white. The first line is white, margined with ferruginous posteriorly. The second line is also white, margined with ferruginous anteriorly. The hindwings are grey-fuscous, but paler anteriorly. Adults have been recorded on wing in December.

References

Moths described in 1920
Moths of New Zealand
Scorparia
Endemic fauna of New Zealand
Endemic moths of New Zealand